Raheem Jarbo (born September 3, 1977), also known by his stage names Mega Ran and Random, is an American underground nerdcore rapper, chiptune DJ, and record producer. In February 2015, he changed his stage name to Mega Ran, removing Random from any releases.

Early life 

Jarbo was born in Philadelphia, Pennsylvania, to an American-born mother and African-born father. He has stated in interviews that he wrote his first song in 1993 and began producing in 2000. After college, Jarbo landed a job as an engineer in a Philadelphia studio, and recorded his first demo which caught the ear of Philadelphia emcee Ohene Savant, who had created a label as a home for creative hip-hop music.
Jarbo resided in Philadelphia until a 2006 move to Phoenix, Arizona.

Education 
Jarbo graduated from Martin Luther King High School in Philadelphia, Pennsylvania, and holds a bachelor's degree from Penn State. He has worked full-time as a special education teacher in Philadelphia, then as a middle school teacher in Phoenix, Arizona. Jarbo maintained both a music and teaching career until 2011, when he retired from teaching to focus on music full-time. Jarbo's albums are currently being utilized in coursework at Penn State University and University of Michigan, among others.

Music 

Jarbo released his debut album The Call in 2006, but is noted for releasing an album called Mega Ran, a tribute to the Mega Man video game series in 2007. This album landed Jarbo a licensing agreement with video game distributor Capcom and an opportunity to perform at the Capcom booth at Comic-Con in San Diego.

This album gained Jarbo a fan base within the nerdcore genre, as well as press coverage by Nintendo Power, IGN, Okayplayer, Complex, Exclaim, and Blender among others.

In 2009, Jarbo released a second Mega Man-based album, Mega Ran 9, based on the PlayStation Network, WiiWare and Xbox Live Arcade video game Mega Man 9. The album was released with the blessing of Capcom.

In 2010, Jarbo collaborated with producer K-Murdock of progressive hip-hop group Panacea and released Forever Famicom, an album containing samples from video games from various publishers on the NES and Super NES consoles.

In 2011, Jarbo created and released Black Materia, an album completely based on the PlayStation and PC game Final Fantasy VII.

In 2012, Jarbo released a remixed version of Black Materia entitled Black Materia: The Remixes. In March, he launched a Kickstarter campaign to release the three-part album, comic book and video game for Mega Ran in Language Arts. The goal was achieved, and Volume One was released in May, Volume Two in August, and Volume Three in November.

In 2013, Jarbo announced he would release one EP per month, titled Time and Space. January, February and March's EP releases were exclusively launched on video game website Destructoid. It was also at this time that Jarbo began referring to his style of music as "Chip-Hop".

In 2013, Jarbo collaborated with New Jersey rapper Mister Wilson and released Blur Bomber, an adaptation of the Archie Comics story arc for the Mega Man and Sonic cross-over in Worlds Collide.

In 2013, Jarbo released "Castelvania: Nocturnal Cantata", a Hip-Hop opera, retelling the story of the classic game "Castlevania: Symphony of the Night". The album cast Jarbo as Alucard, Sammus as Maria Renard and The Ranger as Richter Belmont.

In 2015, Jarbo released his latest album "Soul Veggies" which was his most commercially successful album to date. Mega Ran also toured with Bag of Tricks Cat for the Emerald Knights Tour which included a trip to various UK cities.

In Fall of 2015, Jarbo released RNDM, which debuted on the Billboard Top 200 chart.

In Summer of 2018, Jarbo released "Emerald Knights 2", which debuted on the Billboard Top 200 chart.

Video games 

In 2009, Jarbo teamed with Capcom to feature on a hip-hop alternate soundtrack to the hit title Marvel vs. Capcom 2. Jarbo appears on a song entitled "The Remainder Is One". The album is downloadable on PlayStation Network and at Marvel Comics' website.

In 2010 and 2011, Jarbo's music was covered in video game publications Game Developer and Nintendo Power. Jarbo's album based on the game Final Fantasy VII was featured, and was included in the June 2011 issue of Game Informer and PlayStation: The Official Magazine.

In 2012, Jarbo and Chicago-based developers Lunar Giant Studios released the first installment of the Mega Ran video game, loosely based on the album Mega Ran in Language Arts.

In April 2013, Jarbo lent guest vocals to a track on the soundtrack of the award-winning video game Monaco: What's Yours Is Mine called "Welcome to Monaco.

In September 2013, Jarbo and K-Murdock performed at the first ever Halo 4 Global Championships in Seattle. The event was broadcast on Xbox Live and online.

In June 2015, Jarbo announced via YouTube that he had been chosen to perform the ending credits theme for the game Mighty No. 9. his track will appear on his forthcoming album "RNDM" as well.

In 2016, Jarbo published Tales of the Elements on Steam through his label RandomBeats Music. The game was developed by Last Benevolence. Jarbo is one of the main characters and is also playable. The game was released with an album of the same name that followed the storyline. Tales of the Elements – 2nd Chapter was released in 2018 and once again featured Jarbo as one of the main characters.

Film and television 
Jarbo's song "Grow Up" from the Mega Ran album plays during the end credits of Second Skin, an independent film which debuted at the South by Southwest Film Festival in Austin, Texas, in 2008.

In 2010, Jarbo's song "Splash Woman" played on episodes of TNA IMPACT! and on the ABC special "The Ten Most Fascinating People in America" hosted by Barbara Walters. It has also been featured in the "Aimee" episode of IFC's Portlandia and Comedy Central's Tosh.0.

Jarbo hosted a weekly hip-hop reality show on his YouTube channel called "Life After Lesson Plans". In the final episode he details leaving teaching for music full-time to tour with mc chris.

In February 2012, Jarbo recorded and released a song called "Mega Ran's Jeremy Lin Rap", dedicated to the rise to fame of NBA player Jeremy Lin. The song received 500,000 hits on YouTube, and appeared on the ESPN show SportsCenter.

In August 2014, Glasswork Media released a documentary titled Mega-Lo-Mania chronicling a recent tour by Jarbo. Filmmaker Michael Cardoza traveled alongside Jarbo and soul/funk band The Lo-Classics through three cities to film the documentary.

In July 2017, Jarbo appeared on WWE television as part of a segment on WWE SmackDown Live. He was an extra in a rap battle skit hosted by rapper Wale.

In 2019. he appeared on the ROH/NJPW pro-wrestling event: G1 Supercard, trying to perform his song "Going To the Garden", the official theme song of the event; and having a confrontation against Bully Ray after that. The song was produced by up and coming New Jersey music producer: iLL-Omega.

Performances 
Jarbo has toured the U.S. as  headliner and as support for MC Chris, MC Lars, Louis Logic, Homeboy Sandman, Open Mike Eagle, and others. He has performed at the SXSW Music Festival in 2008–2017, the Nerdapalooza festival in 2007, 2008, 2010, 2011, 2012, 2013 and 2014, and San Diego Comic-Con 2011–2015. He embarked upon his first European tour in July 2011, and in December 2011, provided support on the More B.A.R.K. Less Bitin' Tour of Japan with DJ Asu Rock, K-Murdock, and jazz-hop artists Substantial and Marcus D. Jarbo returned to Japan after a successful Kickstarter campaign. 
Jarbo performed at the Penny Arcade Expo (PAX) in 2013.
He also performed at the east coast's music and gaming festival, MAGfest, in 2014, 2016, and 2022.

Personal life
Jarbo lives in Phoenix, Arizona with his wife whom he proposed to at MAGfest in 2017. In 2021 he released a memoir entitled Dream Master.

Discography

Solo albums

Collaborative projects

EPs

Mixtapes and limited releases

Guest appearances

Bibliography

References

External links 
 
 Mega Ran on Genius
 "The Call" Review by RapReviews.com
 "Mega Ran" Review by Okayplayer.com
 "Mega Ran Review by Exclaim Magazine
 Blistered Thumbs.net Interview-Review
 This Week in Geek Forever Famicom
 Soundcloud

1977 births
21st-century African-American musicians
21st-century American rappers
African-American male rappers
American hip hop musicians
Living people
Nerdcore artists
Rappers from Philadelphia
Schoolteachers from Pennsylvania
20th-century African-American people
Martin Luther King High School (Philadelphia) alumni